Glentana is a village on the Indian Ocean coast to the southwest of George in the Western Cape province of South Africa.

The village was established in the early 20th century, when the first houses in the area were built. The origin of the town's name is unclear, but it is believed to be related to a kind of whiskey brewed in Northern Scotland which carries the same name.

References

Populated places in the Mossel Bay Local Municipality
Populated places established in the 1900s